José Eduardo Mendes Santana also known as Zé Eduardo (born March 3, 1978 in Brazil) is a Brazilian footballer who played for Vista Hermosa in El Salvador as a forward.

1978 births
Living people
Brazilian footballers
Brazilian expatriate footballers
Clube Atlético Mineiro players
Al-Qadsiah FC players
Espérance Sportive de Tunis players
C.D. Chalatenango footballers
C.D. Vista Hermosa footballers
Saudi Professional League players
Expatriate footballers in Saudi Arabia
Expatriate footballers in Tunisia
Expatriate footballers in El Salvador
Association football forwards